Hemicidaris is an extinct genus of echinoids that lived from the Middle Jurassic to the Early Cretaceous. Its remains have been found in Africa, Asia, and Europe.

Sources

 Fossils (Smithsonian Handbooks) by David Ward (Page 178)

External links
Hemicidaris in the Paleobiology Database

Hemicidaroida
Prehistoric echinoid genera
Jurassic echinoderms
Cretaceous echinoderms
Prehistoric echinoderms of Africa
Prehistoric echinoderms of Asia
Prehistoric echinoderms of Europe
Middle Jurassic genus first appearances
Early Cretaceous genus extinctions
Fossil taxa described in 1838